Don Karl Reichert  (11 January 1932 – 8 September 2013)  was a Canadian artist. While primarily a painter in the abstract expressionist tradition, he was also notable as a photographer and digital media artist.

Career
Donald Reichert was born in Libau, Manitoba in 1932 to parents who had immigrated from Austria. He studied art in Canada, Mexico, and England and then taught for many years at the University of Manitoba.  Praised by the critic Clement Greenberg, Reichert produced work which is in many notable collections, including the National Gallery of Canada, the Art Gallery of Ontario, the Montreal Museum of Fine Art, and the Canada Council Art Bank.

Reichert's early work often combined the elegant brush-strokes of abstract expressionist painting with the techniques of color field composition. Other significant strands of his work, center on black-and-white paintings resembling Asian calligraphy, or on the use of Latin American imagery, particularly skull motifs derived from various Latin American ruins. He was perhaps best known, though, for large canvasses painted out of doors. While abstract, these are reflective of the landscapes around him such as the forests and lakes of the Canadian Shield. His technique was unusual: canvasses are laid on the uneven ground, and the impression of the earth beneath is subtly incorporated into the work.

His multimedia works included photographs that had been painted over, often with elegant splattering or dripping in the style of Jackson Pollock. He also created works that incorporate photographs into paintings. As Reichert was an accomplished pilot, many of these were aerial photographs: a continuation of his ongoing interest in landscape.

He worked closely with internationally acclaimed ceramic artist Robert Archambeau, both of whom operated studios in the remote Canadian town of Bissett, Manitoba.

Reichert was for some years been affiliated with the arts magazine Border Crossings. In 2013 Reichert was made a member of the Royal Canadian Academy of Arts.

See also
Aerial photography
Aerial landscape art

Notes

References 
Walsh, Meeka.  Don Reichert: A Life in Work. Winnipeg, Manitoba: Winnipeg Art Gallery, 1995.

1932 births
2013 deaths
20th-century Canadian painters
Canadian male painters
21st-century Canadian painters
Canadian photographers
Artists from Manitoba
Members of the Royal Canadian Academy of Arts
20th-century Canadian male artists
21st-century Canadian male artists